Hsieh Su-wei and Nicole Melichar were the defending champions, but both players chose not to participate.

Natela Dzalamidze and Veronika Kudermetova won the title, defeating Dalma Gálfi and Dalila Jakupović in the final, 7–6(7–5), 6–4.

Seeds

Draw

References
Main Draw

Open Féminin de Marseille - Doubles